Villecourt is a commune in the Somme department in Hauts-de-France in northern France.

Geography
Villecour is situated 30 miles (48 km) east southeast of Amiens, on the D15 road and by the banks of the Somme.

Population

See also
Communes of the Somme department

References

Communes of Somme (department)